Pratt Gilbert Lyons, Jr. (born September 17, 1974) is a former professional American football player who played defensive end for two seasons for the Tennessee Oilers.

Lyons played collegiate football at Troy University and was drafted by the Oilers in the fourth round of the 1997 NFL Draft.

References

1974 births
Living people
American football defensive ends
Players of American football from Fort Worth, Texas
Tennessee Titans players
Troy Trojans football players